BrightFocus Foundation is a nonprofit organization based in Clarksburg, Maryland. BrightFocus funds groundbreaking research in an urgent effort to discover cures for Alzheimer's disease, macular degeneration and glaucoma, and provides expert information and free English and Spanish resources to increase awareness about these diseases. Through its flagship research programs—Alzheimer’s Disease Research, National Glaucoma Research, and Macular Degeneration Research—the Foundation is currently supporting a $75 million portfolio of 287 scientific projects worldwide. BrightFocus has awarded nearly $275 million in groundbreaking medical research funding since inception and supports research and provides public education and free printed brochures and publications on brain and eye diseases, including Alzheimer's disease, macular degeneration and glaucoma. BrightFocus has active research grants in 17 countries and at 154 institutions. BrightFocus Foundation offers free low vision audio chats monthly.

History 

BrightFocus was founded on May 15, 1973, as The American Health Assistance Foundation (AHAF) by husband and wife team, Janette Michaels and Eugene Michaels as Executive Director and President, respectively, and funded research that led to the development of the first artificial heart. 

In 2012, BrightFocus Foundation partnered with three other nonprofit organizations as the 21st Century Brain Trust, which was the runner-up in the Collaborate Activate Innovation Challenge, a competition sponsored by Sanofi US, for the Trust's work in developing mobile applications that detect early symptoms of Alzheimer's disease. Effective 1 February 2013 AHAF changed its name to BrightFocus Foundation. The charity selected the new name to better communicate its goals, "to save mind and sight," according to BrightFocus President and CEO Stacy Pagos Haller.

BrightFocus Foundation funded two researchers who went on to win Nobel prizes, Dr. Paul Greengard and Dr. Stanley Prusiner. BrightFocus funded Dr. Joel Schuman, who found the first biomarker for glaucoma and improved OCT. 

BrightFocus Foundation provided early funding that led to the first-ever Alzheimer's disease blood test development.

Research programs 

BrightFocus Foundation awards grants, fellowships, and produces educational materials and programs through its three research programs, currently funding 287 research projects worldwide:

 Alzheimer's Disease Research Program, currently funding 167 research projects. The program started in 1985 and has funded research for $170 million. In 2022, the program has funded 55 new research projects for nearly $14 million.
 Macular Degeneration Research Program, currently funding 58 research projects. The program started in 1999 and has funded research for $46 million. In 2022, the program has funded 21 new research projects for nearly $7 million.
 National Glaucoma Research Program, currently funding 62 research projects. The program started in 1978 and has funded research for $47 million. In 2022, the program has funded 19 new research projects for nearly $4 million.

Awards and recognition 

In 2013, BrightFocus Foundation earned a Seal of Excellence from the Maryland Association of Nonprofit Organizations, which requires organizations to go through a rigorous application process to certify that they are well-run and worthy of public trust.

In 2021, BrightFocus Foundation received the inaugural Impact Award from the Medical Technology Enterprise Consortium (MTEC) for its work supporting the scientific development of better treatments for repeated mild traumatic brain injury (mTBI).

Charity assessment
Since, 2013, BrightFocus Foundation has earned a rating of 3 stars (out of 4) from Charity Navigator, with an overall score of 85/100 for financial, accountability and transparency. BrightFocus Foundation received a 2022 GuideStar Platinum Transparency certification.

References

External links 
 

Health charities in the United States
Charities based in Maryland
Medical and health organizations based in Maryland